Bandung Football Club was an Indonesian football club based in Bandung, West Java. The team played in Liga Primer Indonesia until the competition finally became defunct in 2011.

When they signed midfielder Lee Hendrie on a free transfer on 27 January 2011, Bandung became the first Indonesian club to obtain an Englishman or a player with experience of the Premier League. Despite being on a two-year contract, his spell was brief and by October 2011 he was playing for English non-league side Daventry Town.

References

External links
Bandung FC
Bandung FC at ligaprimerindonesia.co.id

Defunct football clubs in Indonesia
Football clubs in Indonesia
Association football clubs established in 2010
2010 establishments in Indonesia
Association football clubs disestablished in 2011
2011 disestablishments in Indonesia